"People Say It's in the Air" is a pop song originally performed by Herreys. It is composed by Tim Norell with lyrics by Ola Håkansson.

Herreys versions 

Herreys also recorded and released a Swedish version, "Varje liten droppe regn", with lyrics by Ingela Forsman which appears on the album Crazy People.

Track listing 
The EP contained the tracks
"Varje liten droppe regn"
"Du gav mitt liv en mening"
"Crazy people"
"So much more"

Chart performance 
"Varje liten droppe regn" entered Swedish Trackslistan on 22 December 1984 and stayed on the chart for 3 weeks peaking at #13. It entered the singles chart on 21 December 1984 at #11 remaining on the list for 3 weeks.

Jonna cover
In 1985 Finnish child artist Jonna Tervomaa (then only 12 years old and known with the artist name Jonna) had a cover of the song, with Finnish lyrics and name "Sadepisaroita", Raindrops. The song was on her second album, named Tykkään susta.

Ankie Bagger cover 

In 1988 the song was the breakthrough for Swedish singer Ankie Bagger and formed part of her album Where Were You Last Night.

Izabelle cover 
In 2004 Swedish artist Isabelle Filling (then known with the artist name Izabelle) had a cover of the song, with Swedish lyrics and name "Varje liten droppe regn".

Chart performance 
Bagger's version entered Swedish Trackslistan on 25 February 1989 and stayed on the chart for 4 weeks, peaking at #3.

References 

1984 singles
1988 singles
Songs written by Tim Norell
Songs written by Ola Håkansson
1984 songs
Herreys songs